Egan Chambers (March 22, 1921 – May 5, 1994) was a Canadian politician.

Born in Montreal, Quebec, he was educated at Selwyn House School and Bishop's College School. He was elected to the House of Commons of Canada in the 1958 federal election in the riding of St. Lawrence—St. George. A Progressive Conservative, he was defeated in 1962. He also ran unsuccessfully in the 1953, 1957, 1965 elections and a 1954 by-election. From 1959 to 1961 and in 1962, he was the Parliamentary Secretary to the Ministers of National Defence George Pearkes and Douglas Harkness.

He was the husband of Gretta Chambers and brother-in-law of Charles Taylor. He is buried in Mount Royal Cemetery in Montreal.

Electoral record (partial)

References

See also 
List of Bishop's College School alumni

1921 births
1994 deaths
Bishop's College School alumni
Members of the House of Commons of Canada from Quebec
Politicians from Montreal
Progressive Conservative Party of Canada MPs
Burials at Mount Royal Cemetery